Wedding Crashers is a 2005 American comedy film directed by David Dobkin, written by Steve Faber and Bob Fisher, starring Owen Wilson, Vince Vaughn and Christopher Walken with Rachel McAdams, Isla Fisher, Bradley Cooper and Jane Seymour in supporting roles. The film follows two divorce mediators (Wilson and Vaughn) who crash weddings in an attempt to meet and seduce women.

A sleeper hit, the film opened on July 15, 2005, through New Line Cinema to critical and commercial success, grossing $288.5 million worldwide on a $40 million budget. It was the 6th highest grossing film of 2005 in the United States and became the first R rated comedy to make $200 million at the domestic box office. The success of the film has been credited with helping to revive the popularity of adult-oriented, R-rated comedies.

Plot 
John Beckwith and Jeremy Grey are Washington, D.C. divorce mediators who crash weddings under false identities to meet and have sex with women. At the end of a season of successful crashes, Jeremy takes John to the wedding of the eldest daughter of the U.S. Secretary of the Treasury, William Cleary. Once inside, the pair set their sights on Cleary's other daughters, Gloria and Claire. During the reception, Jeremy has sex with Gloria on a nearby beach who afterwards tells him that she was a virgin. Gloria is possessive and quickly becomes obsessed with Jeremy, and Jeremy urges John to escape the reception with him. Meanwhile, John attempts to court Claire, the maid of honor, but is interrupted by her hotheaded boyfriend, Sack Lodge, who is unfaithful and disrespectful behind her back. When Gloria invites Jeremy and John to an extended weekend retreat at their family compound in Maryland, John overrules Jeremy and accepts in an effort to get closer to Claire.

John and Jeremy become acquainted with the Clearys: the Secretary's wife Kathleen harasses John; Gloria's brother, Todd, tries to seduce Jeremy during the night. Gloria continues to lavish unwanted sexual attention on Jeremy, massaging his penis at a family dinner and attacks him after tying his wrists and ankles to a bedframe; and Sack repeatedly injures Jeremy during a game of touch football. At dinner, John spikes Sack's wine with eye-drops to make him sick and get more time to connect with Claire.

John and Claire continue to bond the next day on a sailing trip. The suspicious Sack takes John and Jeremy on a hunting trip and pranks them, resulting in Jeremy getting shot in the buttocks. While Jeremy recovers, John and Claire go on a bike ride to a secluded beach. Claire finally admits she is not sure how she feels about Sack and ends up kissing John passionately. Meanwhile, Gloria tends to Jeremy's wounds and reveals to him that she is not a virgin as she initially told him. Jeremy realizes that he himself has been played and that he may be in love with Gloria.

While John is confessing his attraction to Claire, they are interrupted by Jeremy being chased out of the house. Sack, who had been investigating them, reveals John and Jeremy's real identities to the family. Betrayed, Claire turns on John, and the Secretary tells them to leave.

Over the following months, John attempts to reach Claire, but she refuses to see him. Expecting Jeremy to aid him, he attempts to sneak into her and Sack's engagement party but is caught and beaten by Sack. Confronting Jeremy about abandoning him, he learns that Jeremy has secretly continued his relationship with Gloria. Betrayed and brokenhearted, John spirals into depression, crashes weddings alone and becomes nihilistic and suicidal. Meanwhile, as Claire and Sack plan their wedding, Claire's doubts about her future with Sack grow. Jeremy proposes to Gloria and tries to ask John to be his best man, but John turns him away.

John visits Jeremy's former wedding crashing mentor, Chazz Reinhold, who convinces a reluctant John to crash a funeral with him. At the funeral, John reconsiders his belief in love and marriage after seeing the grieving widow. He rushes to Jeremy's wedding and joins the wedding mid-ceremony, to Jeremy's delight. Claire is upset by his appearance, prompting John to express regret for his past behavior and profess his love for her in front of the congregation. Sack interrupts, but Claire finally tells him that she cannot marry him. Sack tries to attack John, but Jeremy intervenes and knocks him out, and John and Claire kiss. After the wedding, the two couples drive away from the ceremony and discuss crashing another wedding together.

Cast 
 Owen Wilson as John Beckwith
 Vince Vaughn as Jeremy Grey
 Christopher Walken as U.S. Secretary William Cleary
 Rachel McAdams as Claire Cleary, William & Kathleen's daughter and John's love interest
 Isla Fisher as Gloria Cleary, William & Kathleen's daughter and Jeremy's love interest
 Jane Seymour as Kathleen Cleary, William's wife
 Ellen Albertini Dow as "Grandma" Mary Cleary, William's mother
 Keir O'Donnell as Todd Cleary, William & Kathleen's son
 Bradley Cooper as Sack Lodge, Claire's boyfriend
 Henry Gibson as Father O'Neil
 Ron Canada as Randolph
 Rebecca de Mornay as Mrs. Kroeger
 Dwight Yoakam as Mr. Kroeger
 Jenny Alden as Christina Cleary, William & Kathleen's daughter
 Will Ferrell as Chazz Reinhold (uncredited)

Arizona Senator and 2008 Republican presidential nominee John McCain and Democratic strategist and CNN contributor James Carville both make a brief cameo appearance, they are shown congratulating the secretary and his wife on their daughter's wedding. McCain was criticized for his appearance in the film, having previously called out Hollywood for marketing R-Rated films to teenagers.

Production 
Andrew Panay, co-producer of Wedding Crashers, had the idea for the film based on his own experiences of being excited to attend weddings in his 20s due to the prospect of meeting women. Panay then consulted the screenwriting team of Steve Faber and Bob Fisher to come up with a story based on this premise. Much of the film was based upon Fisher's experiences as an college intern in Washington DC, where he would make up fake backstories to crash lobbyist events. Panay and Fisher's experiences merged together to form the idea of a film in which the main characters crash weddings in order to meet and sleep with women. 

The screenwriters had doubts that the premise could be sustained into a feature-length film, so they decided to add female love interests born from a political family, inspired by their dream of marrying a girl from the Kennedy family when they were young boys. It was also Panay's desire "to explore male friendship through this crazy idea of crashing weddings" as the emotional core of the movie. In preparation for the film, the creators would crash political party platform committee meetings in order to delve into the psyche of the characters and what it means to crash a party.

On April 6, 2003, Variety reported that both Faber and Fisher had struck a "mid-six figures" deal with New Line Cinema to acquire the pitch for the film. David Dobkin signed to direct in 2004, seeing it as an opportunity to pair Vince Vaughn and Owen Wilson, who had previously worked with the director and gave him an Abbott and Costello impression when they were at the premiere of his film Shanghai Knights. 

According to Dobkin, the marketing department at New Line raised some concerns regarding the protagonists of the film, who were seen as misogynists whose goal is to seduce women at weddings and have sex with them. The director saw these characters in a different light, however, convincing the department:

They love weddings, authentically. They like the free food, they like the music and the bands, they like the dancing and the kids, they like talking to the grandparents. These guys make the weddings better. You would want them to crash your wedding.

That's the distinction. It's not misogynistic and, in fact, what it's doing is replicating a real seduction, which is, "I want to go to bed with you, but I have all these walls up. Can you make me laugh, make me attracted to you and find a way to make this really fun so we could get to the good part?" That's a seduction. So, if I can seduce the audience — if I can make them laugh and be entertained and think these are okay guys — by the time they're dropping the girls in the bed, it's a magic trick. That was the whole idea.

Vaughn and Wilson were the first actors cast in the film. Dobkin cast Bradley Cooper without even watching his audition tape as he was so impressed by the actor's test reading. Isla Fischer, then a relatively unknown actress was cast as Gloria over Shannon Elizabeth and Anna Paquin. The casting of Secretary Cleary was a contentious issue between Dobkin and the studio executives, with Dobkin wanting to cast Christopher Walken but New Line Cinema wanting a more comedic actor such as Burt Reynolds instead of Walken who was viewed as a serious character actor. The role of Claire was the final role to be cast, with Dobkin auditioning over 200 actresses before casting Rachel McAdams.

Director David Dobkin originally considered the possibility of releasing a version of the film that was not R-rated in order to broaden the film's commercial appeal, but the idea was abandoned after a consultant provided a long list of the many R-Rated elements in the film, and Dobkin realized "The two funniest scenes in the movie would have had to go." Despite this New Line Cinema still did not want the film to be rated R but eventually conceded to keep the R rating after pressure from Dobkin.

Filming 
Dobkin insisted on three and a half weeks of rehearsals before filming began, based on his background working in theater. Principal photography began on March 22, 2004, in Washington, D.C. The film had a 52-day shooting schedule.

The main Cleary wedding reception scene was filmed at the Inn at Perry Cabin in Saint Michaels, Maryland.  The Ellenborough Estate in Easton, MD is the setting of the Cleary family house, where a majority of the movie takes place.

Director David Dobkin said Owen Wilson was nervous for the scene where he grabs Jane Seymour's breast. "He didn't really want to squeeze her breast when she was telling him to. And I was like, 'Dude, you gotta do it, it doesn't look right, your hands look like crab claws.' And then he did it eventually and that scene ended up being way funnier than I thought it was going to be," Dobkin said.

The family dinner scene has been cited by Keir O'Donnell as the most grueling scene to film with Vaughn stating that the cast and crew were unsure if the scene would work on screen in the way in which it was intended. To shoot the scene in which the family plays football, Dobkin—an avid fan of the NFL—shot the scene in the manner in which a TV crew broadcasts an NFL game in order to make the scene seem authentic and familiar to the audience.

Throughout the filming of the movie the producers encouraged improvisation from the cast, specifically from Wilson and Vaughn, leaving breaks in the script for the cast to improvise. In one scene, Vaughn improvises for over 25 seconds straight.

Release

Box office 
The film was released in North America on July 15, 2005, and became an immediate hit, grossing $33,900,720 in its first weekend, opening at #2 in the box office, behind Charlie and the Chocolate Factory. Exit polling indicated that 60% of audiences were over 25 years old, and almost evenly split between men and women. 

Considering its higher than expected budget of $40 million, competition with heavily advertised blockbusters during the summer season, and the film's R-Rating limiting its potential audience, the studio did not expect the movie's level of success, making it a sleeper hit. New Line head of distribution, David Tuckerman said "We would have been happy with $25 million this weekend." 

The film would prove fruitful, reaching #1 in the box office in its third week and eventually grossing over $209,255,921 domestically, making it the 6th highest grossing domestic film of 2005 and the first R rated comedy to earn over 200 million dollars at the U.S. Box office. It grossed $75,920,820 in other territories, totaling $285,176,741 worldwide. 

The financial success of the film has been credited along with The 40-Year-Old Virgin for reviving the popularity of adult-aimed R-rated comedies.

Critical response 

On Rotten Tomatoes the film has an approval rating of 76% based on 188 reviews, with an average rating of 6.72/10. The website's critical consensus states, "Wedding Crashers is both raunchy and sweet, and features top-notch comic performances from Vince Vaughn and Owen Wilson." On Metacritic, the film has a score of 64 out of 100 based on reviews from 39 critics, indicating "generally favorable reviews". Audiences surveyed by CinemaScore gave the film a grade A−.

Carina Chocano of the Los Angeles Times wrote a favorable review, and in particular praised Vaughn's performance: "Jeremy is the soul of the movie. There's something about Vaughn—the deadpan eyes; the sublimated, misdirected intelligence—that recalls Bill Murray in his Caddyshack years." Chocano was critical of Will Ferrell's "hyper-active bonehead routine" and called the interlude awful. She added that the film was "really just a love story about a couple of buddies who live happily ever after. And it couldn't have happened to a nicer, more charming couple". 

Brian Lowry of Variety described the film as "fairly amusing, fitfully over the top and [...] occasionally a touch homophobic". He praised McAdams as she manages to "fill in narrative gaps and actually creates a real character", said Vaughan's dialog had most of the comedic highlights, and wrote that Walken was underused. Lowry concluded, "While neither a full-throated R-rated romp a la There's Something About Mary nor a fully realized romantic comedy, Wedding Crashers contains enough appealing elements of both to catch the bouquet in what's been a relatively humor-deprived summer. 

Joe Morgenenstern of The Wall Street Journal called the film "the best comedy of 2005" while Entertainment Weekly's Lisa Schwarzbaum described the film as "an unabashedly jiggly, bawdy, it’s-all-good comedy. Manohla Dargis of The New York Times wrote, "It's crude, yes, but also funny; too bad these lost boys can't stay lost.  Like clockwork, the film soon mutates from a guy-oriented sex comedy into a wish-fulfillment chick flick". Roger Ebert of the Chicago Sun-Times gave the film two stars out of four; although he wrote that "there are individual moments that are very funny", he added that the director, David Dobkin, "has too much else on his mind". 

British Movie magazine Empire awarded it three out of five stars and were complimentary to Vaughn and Wilson, saying "Sharing an easy chemistry and free of the usual joker/straight-guy dynamic, Wilson and Vaughn quip, riff and banter to hilarious effect. And both get their fair share of money moments, the latter's muggings are particularly hysterical in a raunchy dinner-party sequence. The laidback stars are funny and sweet, but they're let down by a patchy script which squanders some potentially priceless set-ups."

Kimberley Jones of The Austin Chronicle wrote that the film "will no doubt make buckets of money, but it'll do so without half the wit, compassion, or inspired madness" that There's Something About Mary had. Jones complained that the plot was "mostly cookie-cutter stuff", and was offended by the portrayal of minorities, writing "gays and blacks are represented, respectively, by a squirrelly psychotic and a Jamaican house servant". Jones concluded, "A stiff drink or maybe some pharmaceutical assistance might have made me overlook the film's sour tone, or the unremarkableness of its direction."

Accolades 
On April 24, 2006, Wedding Crashers topped the nominations for the year's MTV Movie Awards with five including Best Movie. It won Best Movie, On-Screen Team (Vaughn and Wilson), and Breakthrough Performance (Isla Fisher).

Home media 
The DVD was released in the United States on January 3, 2006, and a Blu-ray was released on December 30, 2008. It is available in an unrated version ("Uncorked Edition") and in an R-rated version (the Blu-ray has both versions on one disc). It features eight new minutes integrated into the film and DVD-ROM bonuses. Also included are two audio commentaries (one by the stars, one by the director), four deleted scenes, two featurettes, a "Rules of Wedding Crashing" text gallery, trailers, Budweiser Wedding Crashers commercials, a track listing for the official soundtrack on 20th Century Fox Records, a music video by The Sights, and a jump-to-a-song sample feature. The film earned an estimated $145 million from home media sales.

In other media 
David Dobkin directed a music video for the 2014 Maroon 5 song "Sugar", depicting the band crashing real-life weddings, inspired by Wedding Crashers.

Television version 
The creators of the film made a reality TV prank show spinoff, called The Real Wedding Crashers which aired NBC in April and May 2007. The series only lasted 4 episodes before being canceled by NBC.

Discussed sequel 
In a 2014 post on the website Quora, Wedding Crashers director David Dobkin said that he, Vaughn and Wilson once came up with an idea for a sequel in which John and Jeremy find themselves competing with a superior wedding crasher, played by Daniel Craig; but that this idea never went beyond the discussion phase.

In a November 2016 interview, Fisher stated that Vaughn had told her that there were ongoing talks about a sequel. New Line Cinema hired Fist Fight screenwriting duo Van Robichaux and Evan Susser to write the script. As of 2022 plans for a potential sequel delayed indefinitely following developmental and scheduling issues.

References

External links 

 
 
 
 
 

2005 films
2000s buddy comedy films
2005 romantic comedy films
American buddy comedy films
American romantic comedy films
2000s English-language films
Fictional couples
Fictional duos
Films about weddings in the United States
Films directed by David Dobkin
Films set in Los Angeles
Films set in Maryland
Films set in Washington, D.C.
Films shot in Los Angeles
Films shot in Maryland
Films shot in Washington, D.C.
Films about rape
Films scored by Rolfe Kent
New Line Cinema films
2000s American films